Death Penalty is the debut studio album by British heavy metal band Witchfinder General. It was released in 1982 on Heavy Metal Records. The album received some criticism for the cover photograph, which featured topless model Joanne Latham. The photograph had been taken in the yard of St Mary the Blessed Virgin Church in Enville, Staffordshire, without the permission of the local Reverend. The album was originally released on LP and picture disc and was later reissued on CD. Pictured on the cover is Phil Cope, Zeeb Parkes, Graham Ditchfield and a member of their road crew. While Peter Hinton is credited with producing this recording, the writers Phil Cope and Zeeb Parkes always felt the credit should have gone to the engineer Robin George.

Track listing 
All tracks by Zeeb Parkes and Phil Cope.

Side one
 "Invisible Hate" – 6:05
 "Free Country" – 3:10
 "Death Penalty" – 5:35

Side two
 "No Stayer" – 4:25
 "Witchfinder General" – 3:51
 "Burning a Sinner" – 3:28
 "R.I.P." – 4:04

Personnel

Witchfinder General 
Zeeb Parkes – vocals
Phil Cope – guitars, bass (bass credited as Woolfy Trope)
Graham Ditchfield  – drums

Production 
Pete Hinton – producer
Robin George – engineer
Tim Young – mastering at C.B.S. Studios
Joanne Latham – cover model

References 

1982 debut albums
Witchfinder General (band) albums